The Hartley Colliery disaster (also known as the Hartley Pit disaster or Hester Pit disaster) was a coal mining accident in Northumberland, England, that occurred on 16 January 1862 and resulted in the deaths of 204 men and children. The beam of the pit's pumping engine broke and fell down the shaft, trapping the men below.  The disaster prompted a change in British law that required all collieries to have at least two independent means of escape.

Collieries

Hartley old pit
Hartley old pit was established in the coastal village of Hartley, Northumberland, (today part of Seaton Sluice) during the 13th century; the earliest extant records date from 1291. The colliery suffered increasingly from flooding as the seams were worked out under the sea and in 1760 the first atmospheric engine was installed, followed later by more powerful engines. Despite these efforts, the flooding became so severe that the old pit was abandoned in 1844.

Hester pit

The low main seam (F) was reached on 29 May 1846. The colliery was called the New Hartley Colliery and the shaft the Hester Pit. Around the pit a new village grew up that was called New Hartley. Women and very young children (they had to be aged 10 or above) were not employed in the pit and, according to E. Raper (Social and Working Conditions in the village of New Hartley 1845–1900), this gave a higher standard of life for the miners: "the miner in New Hartley would return home after a hard day's work to a warm, clean, comfortable home and usually a substantial hot meal".

In common with many collieries of the period and locality, only one shaft was dug, which was of  diameter, at a total cost of about £3,600.  Coal, men, and materials travelled up and down the shaft, which also accommodated the pumps. In addition, the shaft provided the vitally important fresh air ventilation and extraction of firedamp.

In collieries with two or more pits (for instance see the description of Felling), one pit was the "downcast pit" down which fresh air travelled, the other the "upcast pit" up which spent air escaped. Within the colliery the air was forced to traverse the whole of the workings by the use of walls of coal left in place, stoppings and traps. In this period, the normal means of creating the updraft needed was by using a furnace in the upcast pit.

With a single shaft colliery this simple arrangement could not be followed, and so a timber brattice (B) was built from the top of the shaft to the bottom. Men and materials passed up and down on the downcast side, the pumps worked in the upcast. At Hartley a furnace was kept burning in the yard seam (E) with the rising hot gasses passing up the furnace drift (I) to join and draw foul air up the upcast side of the shaft.

The vulnerability of such an arrangement had already been identified and publicised before the colliery was sunk. An explosion at the St Hilda pit in South Shields in 1839 had led (as the result of a public meeting) to the formation of a committee to consider the prevention of accidents in mines. The Shields Committee issued their report in 1843; it had found that mines in the North-East were unnecessarily at risk of explosions because they were generally inadequately ventilated with too few shafts for the size of the underground workings (a view supported by evidence from George Stephenson, amongst others). The committee's report had specifically argued against the practice for all new works (which it thought Parliament should legislate against), of sinking a single shaft and sub-dividing it by bratticing to separate in- and out-flowing ventilation air (since any explosion destroying the bratticing would destroy the ventilation of the mine and ensure the death by asphyxiation of those underground). It was later estimated that sinking two  shafts instead of one  would have cost an extra £900.

A powerful steam engine, 'the largest in the county employed in mining purpose', was therefore installed in 1855 to operate pumps to recover the pit. Pumping began in September 1855 (in June 1856 the pumping engine was shown off to a visiting French prince) but two years later the pit was not yet in full production and advertised for sale as 'just reopened'.

The pumps were in three stages. The lowest stage lifted water from a sump connected to an adit below the low main seam up to the yard seam. There a second stage lifted the water up to a sump in the high main. The pumps were driven by a nominal  beam engine working the pumps directly: the first two stages were driven by the main beam, and the third stage by a subsidiary beam above the pump staple (C). The pit was known as a wet pit and the engine (capable of nine to ten strokes a minute) normally ran at about seven strokes a minute to cope with the water ingress; on loss of pumping the low main would flood within little more than a day from seawater percolating through the roof of the seam from the North Sea above it. Three miners from Hartley were amongst the death toll of an explosion at Burradon in 1860 because (explained the Durham Chronicle) "little work has been doing at Hartley colliery lately owing to an accumulation of water".

At the time of the disaster, the high main had been worked out and was closed off; the yard seam was being worked, but only by a few men (and a pit pony); the workings in the low main seam at Hester Pit were being extended to meet those at the Mill Pit at Seaton Sluice; within the year it would have been possible to escape from Hester Pit via the Mill Pit. In the meantime, a staple was provided within which was a ladder; this allowed escape to the yard seam from the low main should there be a major inrush of water ("the only thing that was feared").

Disaster
On Thursday 16 January 1862 the fore shift went on duty at 02:30. At 10:30 the same morning the back shift were taking over from the fore shift, so most men of both shifts were at the coal face. As the first eight men were ascending, the beam of the pumping engine snapped and fell down the shaft. Although much of the brattice was destroyed, the first part seems to have deflected the beam away from the cage. Other debris fell on the cage, snapping two of the four support chains. Four of the eight men fell; the others managed to cling on.

Rescue attempts
One of the deputies, Matthew Chapman, had been on his way home when he heard the crash.  Retracing his steps he had himself lowered on a rope and started to clear away some of the debris with an axe.  Realising that the man was exhausted, having just come off shift, the under-viewer Joseph Humble sent him home to rest whilst the main rescue effort was organised.

The initial rescue attempt was carried out under the direction of Humble, Carr (owner and viewer), G B Hunter (Cowpen & North Seaton), Hugh Taylor (Backworth) and Matthias Dunn (HM Inspector of Mines).  By midnight rescuers had reached the damaged cage and George Sharp Snr was brought up in a rope sling.  However, he jammed against some overhanging timbers, came out of the sling and fell to his death.  The rescuers (including the by then rested Chapman) then descended the pump staple and lowered a rope sling from the high main.  William Shape and Ralph Robinson were brought up from the cage in this manner.  Thomas Watson, a Primitive Methodist local preacher, had earlier descended from the cage to the men who had fallen.  He remained with them to pray and comfort them until they died.  Watson likewise ascended in a sling and was therefore the last man out alive.

With the pumps stopped, all knew that the low main would quickly flood.  Those on the surface, therefore, assumed correctly that the men below would make their way via the staple up to the yard seam.    Throughout the night men continued to work from ropes.

By 9 am. They were then relieved by sinkers from nearby pits. William Coulson, the master sinker who had supervised the sinking of the shaft in 1845–46, was on a train passing through Hartley station on his way to another job. When passing through Newcastle that morning he had learnt of the accident; he sent a subordinate to see if assistance was needed. On offering his services, he was put in charge late on Friday afternoon, the previous committee yielding to his greater experience.

There were occasional falls of rock from the sides of the shaft below the high main workings. It became necessary to timber up the sides to secure them before attempting to go lower in the shaft; this took about twelve hours. From Sunday morning onwards, a small hole was excavated through the fallen stone towards the furnace drift. As the men worked through the blockage they were inconvenienced by fumes of carbon monoxide from the upcast furnace and from measures it had ignited. When a small penetration was finally made (3 a.m.

To restart some ventilation a cloth brattice was rigged from the yard seam down to the work area.  This was made from lengths of bratticing cloth held by various local collieries and was not complete until Thursday. On Wednesday morning, with the bratticing incomplete, George Emmerson (one of Coulson's sinkers sent to investigate if what remained of the pumps would collapse further if debris around them was removed) got three yards into the furnace drift before being forced back by the gas.  He had seen an axe, saw and sawn timber, indicating that trapped miners had attempted to escape along that route; but the tools were rusty.

Carr felt able to reply to a telegram sent from Osborne House ("The Queen is most anxious to hear that there are hopes of saving the poor people in the colliery, for whom her heart bleeds") that there were still faint hopes of getting at least some of the men out alive, but these hopes were soon dashed.  At the pit-head standers-by had expressed unease at the slow progress of the rescue operations. Two pitmen in their number (William Adams of Cowpen and Robert Wilson of Backworth) were invited to go down the pit and report back to their colleagues on how things stood; exceeding their instructions, they managed to enter the yard seam and found dead men.

Humble and a fellow-viewer (a Mr Hall from Trimdon) penetrated further and found all the miners dead, but on their return to the bank were severely affected by the gas.  Others went down later but many became seriously affected by the gas: they reported (according to the 'Newcastle Journal') dead men in every direction, most near the shaft; most seemed to have died placidly: "The exploring parties have seen little boys in the arms of their fathers, and brothers sleeping dead in the arms of brothers". The dead pony was untouched; its corn bins had been emptied and some of the dead had corn in their pockets. Although the rescuers had thought they had heard signalling from the trapped men as late as Saturday night, the last entry in the notebook of the back overman described a prayer meeting held at 1.45 on Friday afternoon.

Recovery

The task was now recovery of bodies, and, the check-viewer told the waiters at the pit-head, it was no good throwing away the lives of living men to obtain the bodies of dead men: further entries into the yard seam were suspended until the canvas bratticing was completed, and the shaft properly timbered and cleared further to allow the yard seam to be accessed directly, rather than via the furnace drift.   The following day, the Journal reported ugly scenes at the pithead, with demands that the bodies be retrieved immediately; conversely, the workers in the shaft were becoming more reluctant to run the risk of the continuing rockfalls. On Friday, the rubbish in the shaft fell away to below the entrance to the yard seam, but rockfalls and releases of gas continued.

By Saturday the works were complete and the sinkers and shaftmen withdrawn. The victims had been dead a week and so the bodies were "considerably swollen and disfigured" and the smell from them offensive.  It had been intended to put them into coffins while they were still down the mine, and the medical profession thought it unwise to allow the coffins to lie in the victims' homes until burial. In the event, the corpses were raised to the pit head to be identified as far as possible by the tally-boy, sprinkled with chloride of lime, shrouded, and coffined. In the end, however, as each body was coffined it was either sent home or, if unidentified, chalked "unknown" and sent to the Primitive Methodist chapel for later identification.  The Journal reporter described the consequent appearance of the village: 
All the blinds were drawn; but, looking in at the open doors, we saw coffins in every house. In most instances, they lay upon the large bed, so characteristic of the pitman's dwelling … Sometimes the bed would not contain all the coffins; and then they were disposed on chairs beside it. And so we passed up the row, and saw two, and three, and four coffins all in one little room, till, at last, coming to the end house, we were appalled to see a perfect pile of them…; and looking round, we were informed that seven dead bodies lay in the cottage. In every house women were sitting by the fire nursing their grief; and strong men, pale and dejected, were visibly suffering from the reaction of the excitement of the past week.

The retrieval of bodies continued until four in the morning of Sunday; the yard seam was then checked thoroughly to ensure all bodies had been removed, and New Hartley and surrounding settlements canvassed to confirm that no body was missing.  At one o'clock on the Sunday carts arrived at the cottages and most of the coffins were carried in procession to Earsdon Church.  The graveyard was not large enough and more land was given by the Duke of Northumberland; a large number of graves suddenly needed were dug by men from Seaton Delaval colliery. Fifty men were employed in digging the graves, and they did not complete their task until well after interments started (at about one thirty); dusk was falling as the last coffin was buried.

A list was published of 'the workmen left alive that were employed at Hartley Colliery': there were only fifty-five. The loss of life was extreme, even by Victorian era coal mining standards, and remains one of the worst mining accidents in England.

Causes

An inquest was held on Tuesday 21 January 1862 on the five men killed directly by the beam fall, but this heard little evidence, the coroner expecting a "more particular inquiry, should some of the rest not be got out alive".  The enginemen reported what they had seen and heard when the beam failed; one also told of an incident during maintenance about a month previously. The beam had been lifted by hydraulic jacks from its centre bearing to allow the bearing brasses to be replaced. During this operation, the hydraulics had failed, and the beam had fallen. However it had fallen only , back into its bearings; the witness did not think so small a drop would have damaged the beam; he had not seen any damage to the beam, and the engine had run well until the beam failure. It was also noted that there were casting defects visible at the fracture surface.

As the coroner had foreseen, a second inquest was needed and was held 4–6 February 1862. Sir George Grey, the Home Secretary (to whom the Mining Inspectorate reported) sent down an expert ((John) Kenyon Blackwell) to assist the coroner. Blackwell was to make a separate report on technical issues and was to use the inquest as an opportunity to collect information for his own report.

At the second inquest, a variety of experts and experienced men gave their opinions on the cause of the beam fracture. They differed over some details but were in general agreement that the 'spears' linking the engine beam to the pumps it was operating had failed in tension (some held that this had been triggered by a pump piston jamming; others held that the failure occurred simply because the spear was in poor condition). With the load on the beam removed, there had been an abnormally fast and large stroke and the beam had hit equipment on the 'in-house' (steam engine) side of the beam with great force; the shock loading causing brittle failure of the cast iron.

John Short, the engine-wright, gave the basic information about the engine, the beam, and the pump spears. The beam had been made nearby by Messrs Losh, Wilson and Bell of Walker. It had been assembled from three components. A central 'gudgeon' whose middle portion was hexagonal was threaded through a hexagonal hole in the central boss of two massive castings joined back-to-back with bolts, studs and spacers.

The spears ran as a single main dry spear of  square Memel pine to just above the high main. A 'Y' then connected the main spear both to the wet spear of the second stage pump and to the  square dry spear of the bottom pump.  Coulson reported that the main spear had broken 12–14 feet below the bank; the bottom dry spear was broken at a 'spear plate' (junction piece) opposite the high main. From his examination, they had failed under tension (and therefore, he deduced, before the beam broke).

John Hosking gave expert evidence on the pump beam. He pointed to weakness in the beam design and its installation. There was too much metal in the central boss and in ribs, whose net effect was to weaken the beam. The orientation of the hexagonal holes (apexes at dead top and dead bottom) had both weakened the beam and given points from which a fracture could start. The beam had been secured on the gudgeon by driving wedges between them; from the hammer marks on the wedges, this seemed to have been done with excessive force, which would have introduced undesirably high local stress. It would have been better ('modern practice') to machine the central boss holes and the middle portion of the 'gudgeon' circular, with better engineered keying between beam and 'gudgeon'.

An ironfounder considered the iron of good quality; its strength was demonstrated by the irregularity of the fracture surface, and its quality by the colour of the fracture surface when fresh. There was no undue contraction.

Hosking did not think a pump piston had wedged, the bottom spear had broken under normal load: "The wood does not appear to me to have been of very good quality. It might have been at one time, but is not now."

He dismissed as irrelevant two points which had attracted comment:
 considerable voids ( x ) could be seen at the fracture surface close to the central boss; they were shrinkage voids, to be expected with so massive a casting unless special precautions were taken, and would not significantly affect the strength of the beam. 
 he did not think that the earlier drop had any connection with the subsequent failure: the beam had fallen only  which he thought insufficient to initiate any fracture; the drop had occurred 33 days before the beam failed – he did not think a significantly damaged beam would have survived so long; the fracture surface after the beam failure had been uniformly bright, which ruled out any slow progressive failure or partial previous failure.

Blackwell's report to Grey (written a week after the inquest) concurred with Hosking and drew attention to factors which Blackwell felt had made the accident more likely than for most pumping engines;
at Hartley both 'inhouse up' and 'inhouse down' strokes were driven by the engine, whilst in the usual Cornish engine cycle for beam pumping engines, only the 'inhouse down' stroke was a power stroke, the return stroke being driven by the weight of the pump gear. On loss of load, therefore a Cornish engine would stall, whereas there was nothing to stop the Hartley engine over-speeding to its own destruction.
all three stages of pumping were carried out by bucket pumps; to ensure the bottom stage could be mended if it failed and the mine flooded, it had to be a bucket pump, but the other stages should have been plunger pumps to lessen the normal load on the beam 
On bucket pumps heavy spears would add to the load on the pumping stroke; on plunger pumps heavy spears gave a quicker return stroke, and therefore there was always a tendency for bucket pumps to have less substantial spears. 
Even with equally substantial spears bucket pumps were more liable to break their spears (and hence 'lose the load') than plunger pumps; either by deformation of the piston, or by obstruction of water flow into the pump, and it had been proved that the sump at the bottom of the shaft at Hartley had not been cleaned for a considerable time.

Aftermath
Told that all hope was lost, Queen Victoria (who was herself in mourning, having lost her husband, Prince Albert, only a month previously) sent a telegram of condolence, following it up by a letter: "Her Majesty commands me to say that her tenderest sympathy is with the widows and mothers and that her own misery only makes her feel the more for them". In her personal journal she recorded: "The accounts of the colliery accident are terrible, — such awful misery". The letter was read by clergy to the widows which was "a great comfort and a consolation to them".

Public response
The newspapers were struck not only by the misery of the widows, but by the Christian resignation of the victims, and the heroic determination of those attempting to rescue them: "Everyone must be struck by the good sense, the Christian principle, the intelligence, and bravery of many of the miners who have been brought into public notice by this disastrous event" said the Glasgow Morning Journal . Others were less restrained (and more chauvinistic); "Peril, imminent and unexpected, is the position in which the grandeur of British character stands forth in its full proportions. Give a terrible and stupendous disaster – such a disaster as in some department of industrial enterprise almost every year brings us, and let British workmen be present in the scene, either as victims or spectators – and the consequence will invariably be an exhibition of noble daring, or magnificent fortitude, or unselfish devotion, such as it is impossible to obtain under other circumstances." thought the Athenaeum.

Medals and memorial

The heroism of the volunteers who attempted to rescue the victims was marked by a special medal, the Hartley Disaster Medal; it was struck in gold for Coulson and in silver for the sinkers, who were also given money in proportion to the hours they had spent in the shaft.  An obelisk, commemorating those who died, was erected in the churchyard at St Alban's church in Earsdon.

Relief fund
The Queen's telegram of condolence, after expressing sympathy for the widows and orphans had asked 'what is doing for them?'. An appeal was set up to raise enough money to save them from destitution; it was thought that the victims had left 407 dependents and that up to £20,000 would have to be raised to provide for them. The British public responded generously; despite attempts to persuade them to give instead to other worthwhile causes, £20,000 was raised in London alone; the total receipts of the Hartley Relief Fund came to £83,000.
A fuller reckoning of dependents including 26 posthumous children brought their number up to 467, but even on the most pessimistic assumptions, only £55,000 was needed to provide for them, so in 1863 £20,000 was distributed between the districts covered by each mining inspector, to be administered by local committees and applied for the relief of suffering caused by colliery accidents.  The money provided financial backing for the first miners' relief societies, providing insurance against death or injury, whether in a disaster or incidental to routine operations (in 1862 it was estimated that for every million tons of coal produced, fifteen miners had died ). The Hartley Relief Fund was wound up in 1909; after buying annuities for the ten surviving dependents £13,000 was left and went to the Northumberland and Durham Aged Miners' Homes Associations; the accommodation built with the money was to bear a suitable inscription.

Pit
Hester pit was never reopened.  In 1874 a new colliery consisting of the Hastings and Melton pits was sunk nearby.  In 1901 the low main workings of the old Hester pit were reentered, having been drained by a powerful pump.  From 1929 onwards a series of takeovers and modernisations occurred until eventually in 1947 the new National Coal Board took over. The gradual decline followed with the whole colliery being abandoned in 1959 leaving a further 70 years (at peak production) worth of coal below ground.

Legislation
The inquest verdict was returned on 6 February 1862 and was 'accidental death' with riders including: 

However, giving evidence, a prominent mining engineer, Thomas Emerson Forster, had given as his opinion that "Parliament should pass an act this session" requiring two shafts, but that the materials used in colliery engines "might be left to the people who put up the engines. I myself think there will be no more cast-iron beams"  and this view prevailed.

On 7 August 1862, just six months after the inquest and less than seven months from the disaster, an Act of Parliament (the Act to Amend the Law Relating to Coal Mines of 1862) was passed. This required all new mines to have two shafts and all existing mines to ensure access to a second shaft before the end of 1864; the maximum penalty was £10, but the prohibition was enforceable by injunction. There was no similar legislation to outlaw the use of cast-iron beams in colliery pumping engines, but malleable iron beams became the rule in new installations. An 1863 paper describing a new pumping engine at Clay Cross noted that initially a cast-iron beam had been intended; after the New Hartley accident a wrought-iron beam was specified instead, adding £480 to the cost of the engine (£3130 excluding boiler, engine house and pumps).

References

Footnotes

Citations

Bibliography

 
  – entire text of report, dated 15 February 1862
 
 
 
 
  
 
 
 
 
 
 
  – untitled editorial under general heading.
 
 
  citation added for existing reference.  Only the contents page is online, text unverified.
 
 
 
 
 
 
  – contemporary news report and analysis
  – subsequent, more detailed analysis with diagram
  
 
 
 
 
 
 
 – report of the second coroner's inquest (on the trapped miners)
 
 
 
 
 
 
 
 
 
 
 
 
 
 
 
 
 
 
 
 
 
 

1862 mining disasters
1862 in England
Disasters in Northumberland
Coal mining disasters in England
19th century in Northumberland